The hockey 5s event at the 2018 African Youth Games in Algiers was held at the Stade Ferhani from 19 to 26 July 2018. The tournament served as a direct qualifier for the 2018 Summer Youth Olympics, with the winner and runner-up qualifying.

Boy's tournament

Girls' tournament

Medal table

References

External links

Field hockey at the 2018 Summer Youth Olympics
2018 African Youth Games